William J. Beattie may refer to:

William John Beattie (born 1941/42), founder of the Canadian Nazi Party
William J. Beattie, owner of "Park Dandy", winner of the 1955 Canadian International Stakes